Antara (or Antaragram) is a mental health institution located on the outskirts of Kolkata, India. It is operated by the Antara Society. Antara was established in 1971 and got Registered in 1972 by a group of like minded psychiatrists and other mental health professionals.

Organisation and administration
Antaragram is operated by the charitable trust Antara. Prior to the establishment of Antaragram, the group of founders including Dr. Satrujit Dasgupta, Maj. (Dr.) R B Davis, P M John, and Bro Andrew along with Mother Teresa and Mar Thoma Church, Calcutta operated an Outpatient Psychiatric Unit in 1971. Next year, the group provided residential facilities to mentally ill patients. From 1982 onward, a need arose to cater to a much larger patient population. Land was purchased in the outskirts of Kolkata to establish the larger Mental Health Hospital. The site was called 'Antaragram'. The foundation stone was laid by Mother Teresa in 1980.

Departments
 Psychiatry
 Clinical Psychology
 Psychiatric Social Work
 Occupational Therapy
 Psychiatric Nursing
 Hospital Administration
 Community Mental Health Unit

Services offered
 Out-patient Psychiatric Services
 In-Patient Psychiatric Services
 Inpatient Treatment for Substance Abuse 
 Child Guidance Services (Indoor and Outdoor)
 Psychological Therapy
 Rehabilitation 
 Day Treatment Program
 Satellite Outpatient Department
 Low-Cost Pharmacy
 Community Mental Health Awareness
 School Mental Health Program
 Training for Nurses and Mental Health Professional Students
 Internship for Students (Psychology, Social Work, Hospital Management)

References

External links
 Antara (Official Website)
 Antara involvement in 1999 court case of Illegal Detention

Hospital buildings completed in 1980
Hospitals in Kolkata
Psychiatric hospitals in India
1971 establishments in West Bengal
20th-century architecture in India